Eliecer Montes de Oca Fleitas (born March 28, 1971, in Villa Clara, Cuba) is a Cuban baseball player and Olympic gold medalist.

Eliecer Montes de Oca is a one time Gold medalist for baseball, winning at the 1996 Summer Olympics.

References 
 
 

1971 births
Living people
Olympic baseball players of Cuba
Olympic gold medalists for Cuba
Olympic medalists in baseball
Medalists at the 1996 Summer Olympics
Baseball players at the 1996 Summer Olympics
Pan American Games gold medalists for Cuba
Baseball players at the 1995 Pan American Games
Pan American Games medalists in baseball
Medalists at the 1995 Pan American Games
People from Villa Clara Province